Alamitos Heights is a neighborhood in the south-east portion of the city of Long Beach, California, United States.

The neighborhood is bounded by the Pacific Coast Highway on the north, Colorado Street on the south, Park Avenue on the west, and Bellflower Boulevard on the east.

Surrounding neighborhoods include University Park Estates to the east, Park Estates to the north, and Belmont Heights to the west. Alamitos Bay is located on the south of this neighborhood, and Recreation Park is found to the west.

Alamitos Beach, several miles southwest near downtown, is not contiguous; the Alamitos Heights neighborhood gained its name from Alamitos Bay, not the beach.

From 1904 to 1950, the neighborhood was served by the Pacific Electric Balboa Line.

Architecture

See also
Neighborhoods of Long Beach, California

References

External links
Official Alamitos Heights Improvement Association Website
Map of Alamitos Heights area

Neighborhoods in Long Beach, California